State Highway 34 is a state highway in the Indian state of Andhra Pradesh

Route 

It starts at Kadiri of Anantapur district and passes through Rayachoti and ends at Rajampet of Kadapa district.

See also 
 List of State Highways in Andhra Pradesh

References 

State Highways in Andhra Pradesh
Roads in Kadapa district
Roads in Anantapur district